The 1667 Shamakhi earthquake occurred on 25 November 1667 with an epicenter close to the city of Shamakhi, Azerbaijan (then part of Safavid Iran). It had an estimated surface wave magnitude of 6.9 and a maximum felt intensity of X (Extreme) on the Mercalli intensity scale. An estimated 80,000 people died.

See also
 List of earthquakes in Azerbaijan

References

Earthquakes in Azerbaijan
Shamakhi Earthquake, 1667
Shamakhi Earthquake, 1667
17th century in Azerbaijan